Mijn Franse tante Gazeuse  is a 1997 Dutch film directed by Joram Lürsen and Ben Sombogaart.

Cast
Afroditi-Piteni Bijker	... 	Katootje
Caroline van Gastel	... 	Tante Gazeuse
Boris de Bournonville	... 	O.J. aan de Loire
Walter Crommelin	... 	Vader Tekelenburg
Hanneke Riemer	... 	Moeder Tekelenburg
Nelly Frijda	... 	Burgemeester
Willeke van Ammelrooy	... 	Queen
Loes Luca	... 	Midwife Willems
Hans van den Berg	... 	Buurman van Zanten
Chris Bolczek	... 	Brig. Kluif
Anita Menist	... 	Emmy Gé
Joop van Zijl	... 	Newsreader
Lucretia van der Vloot	... 	Queen (singing voice)

External links 
 

Dutch children's films
1997 films
1990s Dutch-language films